Bryn Mawr Classical Review (BMCR) is an open access journal founded in 1990. It publishes reviews of current scholarly work in the field of classical studies including classical archaeology. This journal is the second oldest online humanities scholarly journal. It provides both online and print subscriptions at no charge. The journal is funded entirely by the sale of Bryn Mawr Commentaries. The journal receives many submissions from volunteers, and its editors maintain an online list of materials that need to be reviewed for those interested. The online version also offers access to Bryn Mawr's electronic resource review, which is made up of reviews of non-print classical scholarly writings. As of now, however, those reviews have not been indexed.

Bryn Mawr Classical Review began in 1990 as a LISTSERV created by John Price-Wilkin of the University of Michigan, who also provided the original gopher site and ongoing technical support for the Review. From 1994 through 1999, BMCR received support from the Andrew W. Mellon Foundation through a project that studied the growth and functionality of e-journals. The current web presentation of the journal was created by members of the University of Pennsylvania Center for the Computer Analysis of Text, Jay Treat, Ken McFarlane, Warren Petrovsky, and Ira Winston, and by Vince Patone and Andrew Lacey of Bryn Mawr College.

In 1993, Bryn Mawr Classical Review founded a sister publication, Bryn Mawr Medieval Review (now The Medieval Review). Both journals are offered for subscription both print and online, and there is also an option for those who would like to subscribe electronically to both journals, but do not want to receive duplicate reviews, as some materials are reviewed in both places.

The current editors of the journal are Richard Hamilton and Camilla MacKay of Bryn Mawr College, and James J. O'Donnell of Georgetown University.

References

External links 
 History of BMCR Bryn Mawr Classical Review

Classics journals